Kirkby Ireleth is a civil parish in the South Lakeland district of the English county of Cumbria.  It includes the villages of Grizebeck and Kirkby-in-Furness; and the hamlets of Beanthwaite, Beck Side, Chapels, Soutergate, Wall End and Woodland. The parish had a population of 1,247 at the 2001 Census. At the 2011 census Kirkby Ireleth was grouped with Angerton giving a total population of 1,174.

Notable people
 Barnet Burns (1805–1860), sailor and one of the New Zealand's first Pākehā Māori
 Margaret Fell (1614–1702), theologian and co-founder of Quakerism
 Henry 'Harry' Gifford (1884–1952), professional rugby league footballer who played for Barrow, Lancashire, England and Great Britain.

See also

Listed buildings in Kirkby Ireleth

References

External links
 Cumbria County History Trust: Kirkby Ireleth (nb: provisional research only – see Talk page)

Civil parishes in Cumbria
South Lakeland District